Bootleggers is a 1974 American comedy-drama film directed by Charles B. Pierce and starring Paul Koslo and Dennis Fimple.

Plot
Bootleggers is a period piece crime comedy drama set in rural Arkansas. The first quarter of the film is set 1921, where 10-year-old Othar Pruitt witnesses his bootlegger father being murdered by a member of a rival bootlegger family. The film then skips forward to 1933 which details the adult Othar Pruitt and his partner-in-crime, Dewey Crenshaw, who make a living as moonshiners and cross-state bootleg runners. The film follows an episodic plotline which details Othar and Dewey's work with interacting with Othar's grandfather's distillery, harassing the local sheriff who demands bribes from the bootleggers, flirting with various women at local social ho-downs, and continue to clash against the rival Woodall family and their chief competitors for control of the bootlegged trail runs. When Grandpa Pruitt is murdered by the Woodall clan, Othar and Dewey decide to take matters into their own hands, leading to a climatic shootout with the Woodall family. In the end, Dewey is killed, and Othar kills the remaining members of the Woodall family, only to be arrested by the sheriff for murder.

Cast 
 Paul Koslo as Othar Pruitt 
 Dennis Fimple as Dewey Crenshaw
 Slim Pickens as Grandpa Pruitt
 Jaclyn Smith as Sally Fannie Tatum
 Seamon Glass as Rufus Woodall
  Betty Bluett as Grandma Pruitt
 Steve Ward as Silas Pruitt
 James Tennison as Mr. Slayton
 Charles B. Pierce as Homer Dodd
  Steve Lyons as Deputy Carl Duggins
 Buddy Ledwell as Mr. McClusky  
 Chuck Pierce Jr. as Othar Pruitt as a boy

Reception
The film grossed over $5.3 million in the United States.

References

External links

1974 films
Films directed by Charles B. Pierce
American comedy-drama films
1974 comedy-drama films
1970s English-language films
1970s American films